Dark Angel is an American biopunk/cyberpunk science fiction television series created by James Cameron and Charles H. Eglee. It premiered in the United States and Canada on the Fox network on October 3, 2000, but was canceled after two seasons. The show chronicles the life of Max Guevara (X5-452), a genetically enhanced super-soldier, portrayed by Jessica Alba as an adult, and Geneva Locke as a child.

Series overview

Episodes

Season 1 (2000–01)

Season 2 (2001–02)

References

External links 
 
 

Dark Angel (American TV series)
Lists of American science fiction television series episodes